Tropical Storm Jangmi, known in the Philippines as Tropical Storm Seniang, was a weak but destructive tropical cyclone that impacted the Philippines during late December 2014. 
It produced heavy rainfall which caused serious flooding. Flooding in Philippines caused 66 deaths and at least $28.3 million damage.

The last of twenty-three named storms of the annual typhoon season, the late-season cyclone remained weak throughout most of its lifespan. The tropical storm reached peak strength on December 29 near Surigao del Sur,
Mindanao. Jangmi dissipated just before the 2015 Pacific typhoon season started.

Meteorological history

Over the next day the depression gradually developed further and was named Seniang by PAGASA as it moved northwesterly along a ridge of high pressure, while atmospheric convection wrapped into the system's low level 
circulation centre.

Highest Public Storm Warning Signal

Impact
Tropical Storm Jangmi made landfall in Surigao del Sur on December 29. It produced heavy rains and caused flooding in Southern Philippines. The storm caused 66 deaths with 6 missing, overall damage in the Philippines were at ₱1.27 billion (US$28.4 million).

In Malacañang, PCOO Secretary Coloma defended the government from criticism that not enough was done to prevent the high casualty count, saying agencies gave timely warnings and that President Aquino had directed government to mobilize all resources to help the victims.

Retirement
Because the total cost of damage reached at least billion, the name Seniang was retired by PAGASA, and replaced by Samuel for the 2018 season.

See also

Tropical Storm Washi
Tropical Depression Usman
Tropical Storm Podul (2013)
Typhoon Soulik (2000)
Typhoon Bopha
Tropical Storm Bolaven (2018)

References

External links

JMA General Information of Tropical Storm Jangmi (1423) from Digital Typhoon
JMA Best Track Data of Tropical Storm Jangmi (1423) 
01W.LINGLING from the U.S. Naval Research Laboratory

2014 Pacific typhoon season
2014 disasters in the Philippines
Typhoons in the Philippines
Tropical cyclones in Malaysia
Jangmi
December 2014 events in Asia
January 2015 events in Asia
Jangmi